The 1987–88 Eredivisie season was the 28th season of the Eredivisie, the  top level of ice hockey in the Netherlands. Six teams participated in the league, and the Nijmegen Tigers won the championship.

Regular season

Playoffs

External links
Nederlandse IJshockey Bond

Neth
Eredivisie (ice hockey) seasons
Ere